Irish Women's Temperance Union was an Irish non-sectarian and non-political organization, founded in Belfast in 1894, for the purpose of promoting temperance among the women of Ireland. Margaret Byers served as its first president.

History
The Union conducted temperance work in schools and at local fairs by means of temperance cafes and tea-tents, and it held mothers' meetings. It conducted a Home for Girls, which cared for 1,000 girls (as of 1926), and a Home for Inebriate Women, which admitted more than 250 patients (as of 1926). It supported temperance missionaries for work among women. Notable people included Sarah R. Barcroft, president of Newry; and Mary Fleetwood Berry, president of Galway.

A petition in favour of the Early Saturday and Sunday Closing Bill was signed by many, and a representative of the Union spent some time in Lond endeavouring to gain support among Members of Parliament, however, the Bill could not be introduced.

Its official organ, Echoes of Erin, was issued in January, April, and September of each year.

Its papers are held at The National Archives.

References

Women's organisations based in Northern Ireland
Organisations based in Belfast
1894 establishments in the United Kingdom
Temperance organizations
Alcohol in the United Kingdom